AD Police Files is a three-part original video animation produced by Youmex and animated by Artmic and AIC. Set in 2027, it is a prequel to the Bubblegum Crisis OVA series, focusing mainly on AD Police officer Leon McNichol, the future rival and love interest of Knight Saber Priscilla Asagiri. 

Due to the legal conflict between Artmic and Youmex, the production of the series was stopped with only three complete episodes made.

Plot 

Chronologically set 5 years before the events of Bubblegum Crisis, it focuses on AD Police (Advanced Police) inspector Leon McNichol's early days in the AD Police.

Cast

Additional voices 
Japanese: Hideyuki Umezu, Hitoshi Horimoto, Kiyonobu Suzuki, Morite Murakuni, Rena Yukie (as Rena Kurihara), Satoko Yasunaga, Shin'ichirou Miki, Toshiya Ueda, Toshiyuki Morikawa, Wataru Takagi

English (AnimEigo): Amanda Tancredi, Amy Parrish, Charles Page, Christopher Alexander, David Kraus, Eddie Harrell, Eric Paisley, Matt Blazon, Michael Sinterniklaas, Rod Barker, Scott O'Quinn, Scott Simpson, Vincent Schilling

Episodes

Release 
In North America, the series is licensed by AnimEigo, who first released the series to VHS and Laserdisc in 1993 in Japanese with English subtitles. They later reissued it in both formats in 1995 with an English dub produced by Southwynde Studios in Wilmington, NC. The show was released to bilingual DVD in 2004, with bonus content featuring music videos for various songs featured in the series as performed by Filipino singer Lou Bonnevie in addition to translation notes and production artwork. On September 27, 2015, AnimEigo announced that they will be funding a brand new HD telecine of the series from the original 35mm film in-house through Kickstarter, with a Blu-ray release planned for 2016.

In the UK, the series was licensed by Manga Entertainment, who produced their own English dub for VHS in 1994, and later issued it onto dub-only DVD in 2004. Their release is now out-of-print.

Reception 
Critical reception of A.D. Police Files has been generally positive. Helen McCarthy in 500 Essential Anime Movies describes The Phantom Woman as the video "definitely not for the faint hearted", noting that the "design is good and the atmosphere well maintained, but it's Aikawa's script that will stick in your mind". She also praised The Man Who Bites His Tongue as a "stylish, dark retelling of RoboCop".

Justin Sevakis of Anime News Network described A.D. Police Files as being "a flawed work, but has enough memorable moments and beautiful, macabre touches to redeem it in some way."

Raphael See of THEM Anime Reviews gave the series a rating of 3 out of 5 stars, praising the story and soundtrack but considered the animation to be "average." Overall, See states that "If you're a BGC junkie, you'll definitely enjoy this one. Other people might want to save this one until they run out of other things to watch."

Legacy

Manga

, a seinen manga series written by Toshimichi Suzuki and illustrated by Tony Takezaki, is set between the first and the second part of A.D. Police Files. It was serialized by Byakuya Shobo on its seinen magazine Bandai B-Club between November 1989 and August 1990. Its chapters were compiled into a single volume that was later translated into English by Viz Communications for the United States and by Manga Books for the British audience and in French by Samourai.

The manga is set in 2032. The A.D. Police are an elite group of highly trained and specially equipped police officers, who have been formed to deal with terrorist activities and Boomer crimes in the city of Mega Tokyo.

The A.D. Police are offered a great deal of leeway in their activities, often blockading large sections of the city and causing great amounts of property damage in the course of fulfilling their duty. Despite their dedication to their jobs, however, the citizens of Mega Tokyo tend to dislike and distrust members of the A.D. Police, seeing them as corrupt and ineffectual.

Related series

In 1999, AIC created a reboot of A.D. Police Files called A.D. Police: To Protect and Serve that was broadcast by TV Tokyo. Unlike A.D. Police Files, it is set in universe of the reboot series Bubblegum Crisis Tokyo 2040, and serves as a prequel to the aforementioned series.

Another OVA series revolving around the A.D. Police, Parasite Dolls, was released in 2003 by AIC. Like A.D. Police Files, it is set in the original Bubblegum Crisis universe and takes place directly after the events of the original OVA series. As of 2022, it is the last Bubblegum Crisis-related series to be released.

References

External links 

 
 

1989 manga
1990 anime OVAs
 
Anime International Company
Dengeki Comics
Films set in 1999
Films with screenplays by Shō Aikawa
Manga Entertainment
Police in anime and manga
Seinen manga
Terrorism in fiction
Viz Media manga